Compsomyiops is a genus of blowflies, in the family Calliphoridae.

Species 
The following species are accepted in the genus Compsomyiops:
Compsomyiops alvarengai (Mello, 1968)
Compsomyiops boliviana (Mello, 1968)
Compsomyiops callipes (Bigot, 1877)
Compsomyiops fulvicrura (Robineau-Desvoidy, 1830)
Compsomyiops lyrcea (Walker, 1849)
Compsomyiops melloi Dear, 1985
Compsomyiops verena (Walker, 1849)

References 

Calliphoridae
Diptera of North America
Taxa named by Charles Henry Tyler Townsend
Insects described in 1918